This is a list of film festivals in Oceania.


Australia

Australian Capital Territory

New South Wales

Queensland

South Australia

Victoria

Western Australia

Nationwide

French Polynesia
FIFO (Festival International du Film Documentaire Océanien) in Tahiti

New Caledonia

Vanuatu

New Zealand

External links
 Movie festivals and events worldwide at the Internet Movie Database
 International Film Festival Database
 FilmFestivals.com
 Ominous Events: The Horror Fests and Cons Database
 Directory of International Film Festivals

 
Oceania-related lists 

Lists of festivals in Oceania
Oceania
Australian film-related lists
New Zealand film-related lists